Hajji Salik B. Abu more commonly known as Ghazali Jaafar (6 May 1944 – 13 March 2019) was a Filipino militant and government official. He fought under the Moro Islamic Liberation Front (MILF). He served as chairman of the Bangsamoro Transition Commission (BTC), and the Speaker of the Parliament designate under the Bangsamoro Transition Authority (BTA), the interim regional government of the Bangsamoro Autonomous Region in Muslim Mindanao.

Early life 
Jaafar was born on May 6, 1944. While in high school, Jaafar established a youth group that encouraged activism among students and out-of-school youth in Cotabato City. He pursued a course in political science at Notre Dame College with an intention to become a lawyer, but stopped studies to join the Moro armed struggle against the government.

Career

Militant
Jaafar was a member of the Moro Islamic Liberation Front (MILF) that initially campaigned for an independent state in Mindanao, but later pursued autonomy for Bangsamoro region. He was the group's Vice Chair.

Jaafar led MILF's dialogue with the national government, serving as the first chairman of the group's negotiating panel from 1996 to 1997. He signed the general cessation of hostilities in Cagayan de Oro on July 18, 1997. The MILF signed a peace agreement with the national government in 2014 under the administration of then-President Benigno Aquino III.

Bangsamoro transition
Under the administration of President Rodrigo Duterte, Jaafar led the BTC, a body tasked to aid in the creation of a draft of the Bangsamoro Organic Law.

He was named into the BTA and made his last public appearance in February 2019 when he and other members of the transition body were sworn in. He was later designated to serve as the Speaker of the Bangsamoro Parliament.

Illness and death
Months prior to his death on March 13, 2019, Jaafar was experiencing an internal illness. In 2018, he was rushed a hospital in Metro Manila due to a heart problem. His last three days were at the Metro Davao Medical and Research Center in Davao City. He died due to kidney failure.

References

1944 births
2019 deaths
Deaths from kidney failure
Filipino Muslims
Moro Islamic Liberation Front members